Paratherina labiosa is a species of fish in the subfamily Telmatherininae, part of the rainbowfish family Melanotaeniidae. It is endemic to  Lake Wawontoa on Sulawesi in Indonesia.

References

Labiosa
Taxonomy articles created by Polbot
Fish described in 1935